The Fair Trading Act 1986 is a statute of New Zealand, developed as complementary legislation to the Commerce Act 1986.  Its purpose is to encourage competition and to protect consumers/customers from misleading and deceptive conduct and unfair trade practices.

The Fair Trading Act provides for consumer information standards.
Under the Act, the Commerce Commission enforces product safety standards on items such as bicycles and flammability of children's night clothing.

Main rules

The Act protects customers from unfair conduct. Unfair conduct has been classified in the act as the following:
 Misleading and deceptive conduct: Generally, in relation to goods, in relation to services and in relation to employment
 Unsubstantial representation
 False representations
 Unfair practices: These include but are not limited to Bait advertising, referral selling and trading stamp schemes. Regulation relation to Trading stamp schemes however has been repealed. 

Part 2 of the Act also looks at Consumer information. It defines standards and also compliance requirements.

A 2015 amendment increased protection against "unfair contracts".

- Difference between the Fair Trading Act and the Consumer Guarantees Act (CGA): the FTA covers claims on products and services before they are bought while the CGA covers claims after the product or service has been bought.

See also
Fair Go, a New Zealand consumer protection television programme

References

External links
 Fair Trading Act 1986
  Article about the Fair Trading Act, Consumer New Zealand website

Statutes of New Zealand
1986 in New Zealand law
Business in New Zealand